The Prophet is a 2004 play by New Zealand playwright Hone Kouka. The play has themes of teenage pregnancy and suicide. It is the third play in the Waiora trilogy of plays. It was first performed at the 2004 New Zealand Festival of the Arts in Wellington. It was published by Playmarket in 2006, and televised as part of the six-part series of Māori plays Atamira in 2012.

History 
The inspiration for the play came when playwright Hone Kouka was touring in Gisborne in 1999 with his play Waiora. While he was there a cousin's child committed suicide. The Prophet was his attempt to find out what teenagers would think about this. The cousins are the children of characters from the first play in the trilogy, Waiora: Ty is Mahurangi's son, Laura and Matt are the children of Rongo, Andrew Beautiful is the son of Amiria, and Maia is Boyboy's daughter. The parts Aunty Kay and Laura were written for the actors Tanea Heke and Waimihi Hotere.

Characters 
The cousins

 Ty – 20 years old
 Matt – Laura's brother, 18 years old
 Laura – 19 years old, Matt's sister
 Andrew Beautiful – Sixteen years old
 Maia – 20 years old and mother to a baby boy

And

 Kay – In her early forties, the mother of the boy who committed suicide, and aunt to the cousins
 DJ Ngutu – Waiora's DJ

Synopsis 
Five teenage cousins return home for the unveiling of a cousin who committed suicide a year ago. The play takes place over three days and is set on a basketball court. It deals with themes of suicide, teenage pregnancy, and urban and rural Māori.

Productions 

The play was televised as the last part in the six-episode series of Māori plays, Atamira. The episode aired on Māori TV on Sunday, 27 May 2012 at 8.30pm. The cast included Tola Newbery, Matariki Whatarau, Juanita Hepi, Cian White, Scott Cotter, and Waimihi Hotere.

References 

New Zealand plays
Plays about sport
Works about Māori people